Giuseppe Ricciotti  (1890 in Rome – 1964) was an Italian canon regular, Biblical scholar and archeologist. He is famous mainly for his book The Life of Christ edited in 1941 and reedited and reprinted several times.

Life
Ricciotti was born in Rome on 27 February 1890. In 1905 he entered the novitiate of the Roman Catholic religious order of the Canons Regular of the Lateran, taking religious vows the following year. After his seminary studies and completing mandatory military service, he was ordained as a priest in 1913.  After ordination, Ricciotti continued his studies at the University of Rome, where he took courses in both philosophy and theology. At the same time he did coursework at the Pontifical Biblical Institute.

During World War I he was required to interrupt his studies and to perform military service, during which time he served as a military chaplain, volunteering for service at the front lines, and was afterwards awarded a Silver Medal of Military Valor for his service in the trenches, where he was seriously wounded. Because of this experience, he came to oppose any kind of war.

After the war, Ricciotti resumed his studies and graduated in 1919 with a degree in Biblical Studies. From 1924 onwards, he taught Hebrew literature at the University of Rome. He also taught similar courses briefly at the University of Genoa and at the University of Bari, where he taught from 1935 to 1960. In addition to this, Ricciotti set up and directed a small seminary in Liguria.

In 1935 he was appointed Procurator General of his religious congregation. During World War II, due to his office he was able to give refuge to many refugees at the congregation's motherhouse at the Basilica of St. Peter in Chains. During this period, he also served as a consultant to the Vatican Congregation for the Clergy. He held this position for his congregation until 1946, when he was named as the Abbot of Gubbio.

Giuseppe Ricciotti died in Rome on 22 January 1964.

Works
Ricciotti's first important work is Storia d'Israele, published in 1932. In 1932 he also published Bibbia e non Bibbia where he supported the need to apply the Higher criticism to the study of the Bible, to be based on the original texts and not on the Latin Vulgate. In 1934 Ricciotti took a stand against the increasing antisemitism publishing the translations in Italian of sermons of Cardinal Michael von Faulhaber in favour of the Hebrews.

The period in which he worked was one of deep suspicion of Biblical Studies in Italy. As a result, Ricciotti was partially involved in the late stages of the Modernist crisis. He was attacked, along with his friend Ernesto Buonaiuti, by the most conservative Catholic wing. Differently from Buonaiuti, his positions were finally judged not to be modernist, and he accepted criticism by the Pontifical Biblical Commission to some of his works.

His masterpiece is Vita di Gesù Cristo, edited in 1941 and published many times. The scholar Nicolotti writes: "His works on biblical texts, of a rather conservative character, show a solid historical and philological training, not at all alien to the contemporary acquisitions of the critic." Ricciotti's Life of Christ was translated from the Italian by Alba I. Zizzamia in 1947. This work received favorable critical reviews in the Catholic Biblical Quarterly and other scholarly publications. Ricciotti's Life of St. Paul (Rome, 1946, trans. as Paul the Apostle, Milwaukee, Wisc., 1953) was meant to complement his Life of Christ. Giuseppe Ricciotti also wrote: La «Era dei martiri», Rome, 1953, trans. Rev. Anthony Bull. New York: Barnes & Noble Books, 1992, La Bibbia e le scoperte moderne, 1957, and L'imperatore Giuliano l'Apostata secondo i documenti, 1958, trans. M. Joseph Costelloe, S.J. (1960; reprint, Rockford, Ill.: TAN Books, 1999). Additionally, he edited a new translation into Italian of the Bible from the original texts.

Legacy 
Ricciotti's book Vita di Gesù Cristo ("Life of Jesus Christ") was extremely popular and influential in Italy, selling 40.000 copies in its first edition and being praised by the Royal Academy of Italy; even Italian fascist dictator Benito Mussolini read a copy of the book. It has been re-printed several times and can still be easily found in Italian libraries and bookstores even today. It was also greatly praised by Catholic peer journals of that time, but received strong criticism from excommunicated modernist Catholic Ernesto Buonaiuti.

Over the time, however, the book received criticism by later Catholic scholars: writing on Il Sole 24 ORE, Italian Catholic cardinal and biblical scholar Gianfranco Ravasi noted that the text was not "not immune to many apologetic simplifications". Catholic biblical scholar Giulio Michelini  also noted that Ricciotti's book shows many of the flaws of Catholic scholars of the time: a tendency towards gospel harmony, vehement and excessive attacks toward Protestant scholarship (especially Rudolf Bultmann), insufficient knowledge of Second Temple Judaism and even some anti-Jewish interpretation of the Gospels (see blood curse). Catholic scholar Giuseppe Segalla, while praising the book for its style of writing, categorized it as an apologetic work.

Despite this, Ricciotti's work is still widely appreciated by Italian conservative Catholics like Vittorio Messori and Luca Doninelli.

References

External links 
 
 
 

1890 births
1964 deaths
Canonical Augustinian scholars
Roman Catholic biblical scholars
Translators of the Bible into Italian
Writers from Rome
Italian archaeologists
Academic staff of the University of Bari
World War I chaplains
Italian people of World War I
Italian military chaplains
Canonical Augustinian abbots and priors
Recipients of the Silver Medal of Military Valor
Pontifical Biblical Institute alumni
20th-century translators
Canons Regular of the Lateran
20th-century archaeologists
20th-century Italian Roman Catholic priests